Gaggi (Sicilian: Kaggi) is a comune (municipality) in the Province of Messina in the Italian region of Sicily, located about  east of Palermo and about  southwest of Messina.

The municipality of Gaggi contains the frazioni (subdivisions, mainly villages and hamlets) Cavallaro, Palmara, Falcò, Costa arancione, and Billirè. Gaggi borders the following municipalities: Castelmola, Castiglione di Sicilia, Graniti, Mongiuffi Melia, Taormina.

Demographic evolution

References

Cities and towns in Sicily